Honour is a novel by Elif Shafak, published in 2012 by Viking. The book is the ninth novel by Shafak, and her fourth written in English. It was rereleased by Penguin Essentials in 2020.

References

External links
 

2012 novels
Novels set in Turkey
Novels set in London

Novels by Elif Şafak
Viking Press books